The Gusenbauer government was sworn in on 11 January 2007 and left office on 2 December 2008.

Composition
The cabinet was a coalition between the Social Democratic Party and the People's Party. Each party had seven members in the cabinet.

References

2007 establishments in Austria
2008 disestablishments in Austria
Politics of Austria
Austrian governments
2000s in Austria